KZXK (98.9 FM) is a radio station licensed to Doney Park, Arizona, United States. The station airs a commercial-free rock music format. The station is owned by Cochise Broadcasting, LLC.

Format
The station format is late–1960s to late–1980s album rock. It is fully automated, has no DJs and does not play any commercial announcements other than its own station identification.

History
KZXK was powered-on by Ted Tucker, a former hospital pharmacist and broadcast-radio engineer, who owns several radio stations in throughout the Western United States under the corporate names "Desert West Air Ranchers Corporation" and "Cochise Broadcasting, LLC".

The station license was granted by the Federal Communications Commission on December 2, 2009 and, according to a published report, began operations on April 7, 2010.

The station holds a U.S. Federal Communications Commission construction permit to upgrade to a C2 class with a power increase to 560 watts ERP. Source: FCC Engineering ('FMQ') Database.

References

External links
 

Classic rock radio stations in the United States
ZXK
Mass media in Coconino County, Arizona